Andreas Krause Landt (born 1963), also known as Andreas Lombard, is a German journalist and publisher of Jewish ancestry, and the author of popular history books.

Biography
Krause Landt was born in Hamburg in 1963, the paternal grandson of the French Calvinist pastor . He studied philosophy, German literature, and history at Heidelberg University and the Free University of Berlin, completing his studies in 1993 with a Magister's thesis entitled "Topographies of the sublime: alienation and aestheticism in the work of Peter Weiss".

He then worked writing screenplays for dubs and from 1996 as a freelance journalist, notably for the Berliner Zeitung and Deutschlandradio Kultur.

In 2005 he founded the publisher , which publishes mainly works on 19th- and 20th-century history. In 2007 Krause Landt received the Gerhard Löwenthal Prize for journalism in recognition of his work at Landt Verlag.

On 30 July 2013, Krause Landt expressed a stance against adoption of children by same-sex couples.

Andreas Lombard is the editor in chief of the conservative magazine CATO.

References

External links 
Landt Verlag

1963 births
Living people
German people of Jewish descent
Journalists from Hamburg
German male journalists
German publishers (people)
21st-century German historians